Martha J. Harvey was a founder of the York Sunbury Historical Society which was established in 1932. She was a president of Fredericton's Women's Institute, an involved member of the Social Service Council, and was deeply committed to the welfare of the greater Fredericton community. 
      
The Martha J. Harvey Award of Distinction is presented to individuals, or groups, who have shown a dedicated commitment to the goals of the York Sunbury Historical Society. Past awards have honoured those who have made significant contributions in writing the history of central New Brunswick, in preserving its artefacts and heritage buildings, or in offering exemplary service to the Society in its efforts to discover and preserve the history and heritage of York and Sunbury counties.

Martha Harvey was the wife of John Harvey, founder of Harvey's Photography Studio in Fredericton, New Brunswick in 1883. John died in 1901 at which time Martha took over the business and eventually sold it to Frank Pridham in 1917.

Martha J. Harvey Award of Distinction Recipients:

1981 - Lt. Gen Ernest William Sansom 
1984 - Muriel McQueen Fergusson
1984 - Lucy McNeil 
1985 - Dr. Alfred Bailey 
1985 - Dr. D.J. McLeod 
1986 - Louise Hill 
1987 - Fred H. Phillips 
1988 - Dr. Elizabeth McGahan 
1988 - Dr. Stuart Smith 
1989 - Dr. James Chapman 
1990 - Alden J. Clark 
1991 - Dr. Ivan H. Crowell 
1992 - Velma Kelly 
1993 - Ted Jones 
1993 - Dr. Murray Young 
1994 - Donna Wallace 
1995 - Richard Bird 
1996 - Fred White 
1998 - Ruth Scott 
2000 - Government of New Brunswick Heritage Branch 
2004 – Frederick Wilmot Hubbard 
2005 - Mr. & Mrs. T.W. Acheson 
2009 - Paul O'Connell 
2010 - The Gregg Centre for the Study of War and Society 
2010 - Honorable David Dickson

References

Canadian women historians
People from Fredericton
Year of birth missing
20th-century Canadian historians